Jeotgalicoccus pinnipedialis is a gram-positive bacterium. It belongs to the Staphylococcaceae. The cells are coccoid. It was found in the swab of the mouth of a Southern elephant seal.

References

External links
Type strain of Jeotgalicoccus pinnipedialis at BacDive -  the Bacterial Diversity Metadatabase

pinnipedialis
Bacteria described in 2004